is a Japanese former cyclist. She competed in the women's sprint at the 1992 Summer Olympics.

References

External links
 

1971 births
Living people
Japanese female cyclists
Olympic cyclists of Japan
Cyclists at the 1992 Summer Olympics
People from Nara, Nara
Cyclists at the 1994 Asian Games
Asian Games competitors for Japan